Giannis Giannoulis (alternate spellings: Gioannis, Yannis, Ioannis, Yiannis (Greek: Γιάννης Γιαννούλης; born June 5, 1976) is a Greek-Canadian former professional basketball player. During his playing career, at a height of 2.08 m (6'10") tall, he played at both the power forward and center positions.

Early years
Giannoulis was born on 5 June 1976, in Toronto, Canada. Considered a great young talent at the center position, Giannoulis began playing youth club basketball in Greece, with the junior youth teams of Filathlitikos Karditsa and Ampelokipoi. After spending time with the youth teams of Esperos Kallitheas in 1992, he joined the junior team of PAOK Thessaloniki, where he played from 1992 to 1994. With PAOK, he won the Greek Under-18 club championship, in 1994.

Professional career

Europe
Giannoulis began his pro career with the senior men's club of PAOK Thessaloniki. He was an All-EuroLeague Second Team member in the EuroLeague 2000–01 season, while playing with PAOK. In the next season, he won the EuroLeague 2001–02 championship, with Panathinaikos Athens. A failed drug test, at the end of the 2001–02 season, cost Giannoulis a ban from all European continental competitions for 2 years, which was a great blow to his career.

United States
Giannoulis played with the NBA club the Toronto Raptors, during the 2002–03 NBA preseason, under the name of "Ioannis Giannoulis". He then signed with the Yakima SunKings, of the Continental Basketball Association, in November 2002. He also played with the Huntsville Flight (later known as the Canton Charge), of the NBA D-League, during the 2002–03 season, after joining the club in February 2003. After playing with the Flight in just two games, Giannoulis requested to be waived from the D-League team, and then returned to the Greek League.

Return to Europe
After playing professionally in the United States during his drug ban, Giannoulis returned to Europe to play in the Greek League, for the 2003–04 season. Giannoulis played with Panionios in the European-wide secondary level EuroCup competition's 2007–08 season, and had a very good individual season; and that same year, in the Greek League 2007–08 season, he helped to lead Panionios to a 3–2 series playoff victory over Maroussi, in the league's next season's 3rd place EuroLeague qualifier series. He then played with Panionios in the following EuroLeague 2008–09 season.

In his club career, Giannoulis played with some of the following European teams: PAOK Thessaloniki, Panathinaikos Athens, Panionios, Málaga, Kyiv, Sevilla, Aris Thessaloniki, AEL Limassol, and Doukas. During his career, he competed at the highest European club level, the EuroLeague, in a total of eight seasons (1994–95, 1997–98, 1998–99, 1999–00, 2000–01, 2001–02, 2006–07, 2008–09). In those eight seasons, he played in a total of 94 EuroLeague games, in which he averaged 6.7 points and 4.1 rebounds per game.

Giannoulis played with the Cypriot League club AEL Limassol in the 2009–10 season. After that, he began a long career playing in the Greek minor leagues, starting with the Greek club Vouliagmeni, in the 2010–11 season.

National team career

Greek junior national team
Giannoulis was a member of the junior national teams of Greece. With Greece's junior national teams, he played at the 1993 FIBA Europe Under-16 Championship, where he won a gold medal. He also played with Greece at the 1994 FIBA Europe Under-18 Championship, and at the 1996 FIBA Europe Under-20 Championship.

Greek senior national team
Giannoulis was also a member of the senior men's Greek national team. He competed with Greece at the 1997 EuroBasket, the 1999 EuroBasket, and the 2001 EuroBasket. After being banned from continental competitions for two years, due to a failed drug test, he was removed from the senior Greek national team and he was never recalled to it after that. With Greece's senior national team, he had a total of 63 caps.

References

External links 
Official Twitter Account 
FIBA Archive Profile
FIBA Europe Profile
Euroleague.net Profile
RealGM.com Profile
ProBallers.com Profile
Eurobasket.com Profile
Spanish League Archive Profile 
Greek Basket League Profile 
Hellenic Basketball Federation Profile 

1976 births
Living people
AEL Limassol B.C. players
Aris B.C. players
Baloncesto Málaga players
BC Kyiv players
Canadian expatriate basketball people in Spain
Canadian expatriate basketball people in the United States
Canadian men's basketball players
Canadian people of Greek descent
Centers (basketball)
Doukas B.C. players
Esperos B.C. players
Greek Basket League players
Greek expatriate basketball people in Spain
Greek expatriate basketball people in the United States
Greek men's basketball players
Huntsville Flight players
Liga ACB players
MENT B.C. players
P.A.O.K. BC players
Panathinaikos B.C. players
Panionios B.C. players
Sportspeople from Karditsa
Power forwards (basketball)
Real Betis Baloncesto players
Basketball players from Toronto
Yakima Sun Kings players